Mizque Municipality is the first municipal section of the Mizque Province in the Cochabamba Department, Bolivia. Its seat is Mizque.

Geography 
Some of the highest mountains of the municipality are listed below:

Subdivision 
Mizque Municipality is divided into six cantons.

References

External links 
 Population data and map of Mizque Municipality

Municipalities of the Cochabamba Department